Berezovka is a rural locality (a village) in Irnykshinsky Selsoviet, Arkhangelsky District, Bashkortostan, Russia. The population was 44 as of 2010. There is 1 street.

Geography 
Berezovka is located 19 km northwest of Arkhangelskoye (the district's administrative centre) by road. Karakul is the nearest rural locality.

References 

Rural localities in Arkhangelsky District